The Midlands Men's Division 1 is a rugby league competition for clubs in the English Midlands. It was formerly known as the Rugby League Conference Midlands Division. Many of the clubs run juniors in the Midlands Junior League.

History

The Rugby League Conference was born in 1997, as the Southern Conference. It featured teams from the South of England and the English Midlands. The Midlands Division was first created in 2001 and lasted until 2003; by 2004, there were enough Midlands teams playing in the conference for them to be split into smaller divisions.

The Premier Division were set up in 2005 for teams who had achieved a certain playing standard and were able to travel further afield to find stronger opposition. The new Premier Divisions included the North Premier, the South Premier, the Central Premier and the Welsh Premier. The Central Premier had two Midlands clubs Telford Raiders and Nottingham Outlaws and the rest of the clubs were from Yorkshire or Lancashire.

The Midlands Merit League was founded in late 2005 as a feeder league for the Rugby League Conference, in order to support the growth of rugby league in the Midlands. Clubs were able to play competitive games without committing to a full fixture list. It later evolved into the Midlands Rugby League Division Two.

The Midlands Premier was created one season later in 2006. With the new Midlands Premier division, there was only one Midlands regional division from 2006 but it would not be until 2010 that it would be known as the Midlands regional. In 2011, the Midlands teams were split into East and West divisions with group winners playing off for the Midlands Premier title and the losers competing for the Midlands regional.

In 2012 the Rugby League Conference was disbanded with the RLC Midlands Division becoming the Division One of the Midlands Rugby League. In 2013 there was no standalone division 1 but the title will nevertheless be played for by the teams finishing between fifth and eighth in the premier division.

Community game pyramid

 National Conference League
 Conference League South
 Midlands Rugby League Premier Division
 Midlands Rugby League Division One
 Midlands Rugby League Division Two

Participating teams

West
Coventry Dragons
Leamington Royals
NEW Ravens
Telford Raiders
Wolverhampton RLFC

East
Leicester Storm A
Northampton Demons A
Nottingham Outlaws A
Sleaford Spartans

Division One will be split into East and West regions with teams playing sides in their own region twice and the other one once giving a league season of 11 or 12 games followed by semi-finals for the top two in each region. The overall winner will be determined by a grand final.

Wolverhampton failed to complete the season but their results stood.

Past winners

Rugby League Conference regional titles
2001 RLC Midlands Division: Coventry Bears
2002 RLC Midlands Division: Coventry Bears
2003 RLC Midlands Division: Birmingham Bulldogs
2004 RLC North Midlands Division: Nottingham Outlaws, RLC South Midlands Division: Leicester Phoenix
2005 RLC North Midlands Division: Thorne Moor Marauders (now Moorends-Thorne Marauders RLFC), RLC West Midlands Division: Wolverhampton Wizards (now Wolverhampton RLFC)
2006 RLC North Midlands & South Yorkshire Division: Moorends-Thorne Marauders RLFC, RLC West Midlands and South West Division: Gloucestershire Warriors
2007 RLC West Midlands Division: Bristol Sonics
2008 RLC West Midlands Division: Bristol Sonics
2009 RLC North Midlands Division: Parkside Hawks
2010 RLC Midlands Division: Leamington Royals
2011 RLC Midlands Division: Telford Raiders

Midlands Rugby League Division One
2012 Telford Raiders
2013 Coventry Bears A

References

External links
 Official website
 Unofficial RLC website
 Midlands rugby league site
 Gloucestershire Rugby League
 Rugby League Outsiders - Midlands Podcast website

Rugby League Conference
Rugby league in England